Aurora Melbourne Central is a  high residential skyscraper in Melbourne, Australia. It is Melbourne's third-tallest building and the fifth tallest building in Australia.

Developed by Malaysian–based UEM Sunrise and designed by Elenberg Fraser, the project was first proposed in 2014, and received approval by then-Planning Minister Matthew Guy in October 2014. Previously named 224-252 La Trobe Street, after the address of the  site, the project was later renamed to Aurora Melbourne Central after the natural light display aurora australis, and the shopping centre of the same name.

In 2019, when the tower was completed, it was the second-tallest building in Melbourne, at the time behind the Eureka Tower. Aurora will comprise 959 residential apartments and 252 serviced apartments across 86 storeys; as such, it will also be one of the biggest residential buildings in Australia.

Construction on the $730 million project commenced in October 2015 by Probuild, and the skyscraper topped-out in late 2018. Completion is expected in 2019.

References

External links

Apartment buildings in Melbourne
Residential buildings completed in 2019
Residential skyscrapers in Australia
Skyscrapers in Melbourne
2019 establishments in Australia
Buildings and structures in Melbourne City Centre